Florencia Colucci Long (Montevideo; November 3, 1986) is an actress and director of Cinema Uruguay.

For her acting work she has won: the ICAU award (Film Critics Association of Uruguay) for "Best Actress"; "Actress" in 2011 for her work on The Silent House ; Award "Woman of the Year" 2011 (awarded annually by the mayor of Tarariras, Colonia, Uruguay); Award "Woman of the Year" (in its twelfth edition, Uruguay) 2012 in the category "acting in film or TV"; Iris award for "Best actress in film" 2012 for her performance in The Silent House . It has also obtained a "spatial reference" in the FICU festival for the realization of her animated short Macaco.

References

External links

1986 births
Actresses from Montevideo
Uruguayan people of Italian descent
Uruguayan film actresses
Uruguayan film directors
Living people